Giovanni K. Tuck is a retired United States Air Force lieutenant general who last served as the director for logistics of the Joint Staff. In his position, he integrates logistics planning and execution in support of global operations and assists the Chairman of the Joint Chiefs of Staff in fulfilling his responsibilities. Prior to that, he was commander of the Eighteenth Air Force.

In July 2020, Major General Sam C. Barrett, who replaced him as commander of the 18th Air Force, was nominated to succeed him as director for logistics of the Joint Staff.

References 

Living people
Year of birth missing (living people)